Lola Edna Brooks (7 February 1933 – 1985) was a New Zealand-Australian actor with extensive credits in radio, theatre and television. She was once married to actor Richard Meikle. She appeared on stage in The Boy Friend.

Select filmography
 Tomorrow's Child (1957)
 The Importance of Being Earnest (1957)
 His Excellency (1958)
 Bodgie (1959)
 On the Beach (1959)
 The Sundowners (1960)
 Emergency-Ward 10 (1960)
 Fury in Petticoats (1962)
 The Young Victoria (1963)
 The Right Thing (1963)
 A Private Island (1964)
 Twelfth Night (1966)

References

External links
 
 Lola Brooks at Ausstage

1933 births
1985 deaths
Australian actors